Fr. Andrew Pinsent (born 1966) is Research Director of the Ian Ramsey Centre for Science and Religion, part of the Faculty of Theology and Religion at the University of Oxford. He is also a Research Fellow at Harris Manchester College, Oxford, and a Catholic priest of the diocese of Arundel and Brighton in England.

A physicist by training, Pinsent was involved in the DELPHI project at CERN, and co-authored 31 of the collaboration's publications. A focus of his current research is the application of insights from autism and social cognition to "second-person" accounts of moral perception and character formation.

Education and career
Pinsent has a first-class degree in physics and a D.Phil. in high-energy physics from Merton College, Oxford. He also has three degrees in philosophy and theology from the Pontifical Gregorian University in Rome, and a Ph.D. in philosophy from Saint Louis University. 

A member of the United Kingdom Institute of Physics and a tutor of the Maryvale Institute in Birmingham, Pinsent has been interviewed for various media, including the BBC and EWTN, on issues of science and faith. He has also written for the Catholic Herald, who identified him as a prominent young Catholic. His most recent book is The Second-Person Perspective in Aquinas’s Ethics: Virtues and Gifts (2012). Besides academic publications, he is a co-author of the Evangelium catechetical course and the Credo, Apologia, and Lumen pocket books. Pinsent was a signatory of the 2017 'filial correction' Correctio filialis de haeresibus propagatis ascribing heretical content to Pope Francis's apostolic exhortation Amoris laetitia.

See also
List of Roman Catholic cleric-scientists

References

External links
Fr. Pinsent's Website
Ian Ramsey Centre for Science and Religion

Living people
20th-century British Roman Catholic priests
British physicists
Catholic clergy scientists
1966 births
People associated with CERN
Alumni of Merton College, Oxford
Saint Louis University physicists
21st-century British Roman Catholic priests